Butacaine is a white crystalline ester used as a local anesthetic.

Synthesis

The addition of metallic sodium is added to a mixture of allyl alcohol (1) and N,N-dibutylamine (2) gives the conjugate addition product and hence 3-dibutylamino-1-propanol [2050-51-3] (3). Esterification of this intermediate with para-nitrobenzoyl chloride [122-04-3] (4) gives CID:4588466 (5). The reduction of the nitro group completed the synthesis of butacaine (6).

See also
Isobucaine

References 

Local anesthetics
4-Aminobenzoate esters